Transcriptional adapter 2-alpha is a protein that in humans is encoded by the TADA2A gene.

Function 

Many DNA-binding transcriptional activator proteins enhance the initiation rate of RNA polymerase II-mediated gene transcription by interacting functionally with the general transcription machinery bound at the basal promoter. Adaptor proteins are usually required for this activation, possibly to acetylate and destabilize nucleosomes, thereby relieving chromatin constraints at the promoter. The protein encoded by this gene is a transcriptional activator adaptor and has been found to be part of the PCAF histone acetylase complex. Two transcript variants encoding different isoforms have been identified for this gene.

Interactions 

TADA2L has been shown to interact with GCN5L2, TADA3L and Myc.

References

Further reading